Comparative is a syntactic construction that serves to express a comparison between two (or more) things or groups of things.

Comparative may also refer to:

Language
 Comparison (grammar), the grammar of comparatives in various languages
 Comparative case, a grammatical case used in the Mari language
 Comparative linguistics, a method used in the study of languages
 Comparative method (linguistics), a technique used in historical linguistics
 Quantitative comparative linguistics, a computational technique used in the study of languages

Literature
 Comparative Critical Studies, a literary journal
 Comparative literature, a method used in the study of literature

Social sciences
 Comparative contextual analysis, an epistemological method in philosophy
 Comparative Politics, a field and a method in the study of Politics
 Comparative education, a method used in the study of education
 Comparative Effectiveness, a term from health care intervention
 Comparative psychology, a method used in psychology
 Comparative sociology, a method used in sociology
 Historical comparative research, a technique of historical sociology
 Law of comparative judgment, a model of psychomeasurement and psychophysics
 Qualitative comparative analysis, a comparative tool used in various social science fields

Government and law
 American Journal of Comparative Law, a journal
 Comparative government, a method used in political science
 Comparative law, a method used in the study of law
 Comparative negligence, a partial legal defense
 Comparative politics, a method used in political science
 Comparative responsibility, a term from tort law

Biology
 Comparative anatomy, a technique used in the study of anatomy
 Comparative biology, a technique of biology
 Comparative cognition, a branch of biology
 Comparative genomics, a method used in genetics
 Comparative genomic hybridization, a technique of genetics
 Comparative neuropsychology, a technique for studying the brain
 Comparative physiology, a technique used in physiology
 Integrative and Comparative Biology, a journal
 Museum of Comparative Zoology, at Harvard University
 Phylogenetic comparative methods, statistical and other techniques that incorporate phylogenetic information when comparing species

Cultural studies
 Comparative cultural studies, the study of cultures from a cross-cultural point of view
 Comparative history, a technique used in the study of history
 Comparative mythology, a method used in the study of mythology
 Comparative religion, a method used in the study of religion
 Comparative research, a cross-cultural technique
 List of Muslim comparative religionists, a who's who of Muslims engaged in comparative Islamic studies
 Studies in Comparative Religion, a journal

Economics
 Comparative advantage, a law of economics
 Comparative advertising, a marketing technique
 Comparative economic systems, a method of economics
 Comparative statics, a method of economics

See also

The Comparative Method or Comparative Measurement in art is described in Atelier (art).
Comparative analysis (disambiguation)
Comparator
Comparison (disambiguation)